is a private university in Shinjuku, Tokyo, Japan. The predecessor of the school was founded in 1943. It was chartered as a junior college in 1951 and became a four-year college in 2002.

In 2008 the Department of Psychology was established.

External links
 Official website 

Educational institutions established in 1943
Private universities and colleges in Japan
Universities and colleges in Tokyo
1943 establishments in Japan